Fred Clinton Jacobs (September 13, 1865 – February 21, 1958) was a United States district judge of the United States District Court for the District of Arizona.

Education and career

Born in Winchester, Massachusetts, Jacobs attended the University of Chicago. He was in private practice in San Jose, California from 1895 to 1906. He was in private practice in Phoenix, Arizona Territory (State of Arizona from February 14, 1912) from 1906 to 1923.

Federal judicial service

Jacobs was nominated by President Warren G. Harding on February 28, 1923, to the United States District Court for the District of Arizona, to a new seat created by 42 Stat. 837. He was confirmed by the United States Senate on March 2, 1923, and received his commission the same day. He assumed senior status on May 31, 1936. Jacobs served in that capacity until his death on February 21, 1958.

References

Sources
 

1865 births
1958 deaths
Judges of the United States District Court for the District of Arizona
United States district court judges appointed by Warren G. Harding
20th-century American judges
University of Chicago alumni